Amtrak, the national passenger railroad company of the United States

Amtrak may also refer to:
Amtrak California, the brand name given to state-sponsored Amtrak routes in California
Amtrak Express, Amtrak's freight and shipping service 
Amtrak Express Parcels, a former British parcel delivery company 
Landing Vehicle Tracked, known as "amtrak" and "amtrac"

See also

The Amtrak Wars, a 1983–1990 novel series by Patrick Tilley
Amtrac (musician) (Caleb Cornett, born 1987), an American DJ, producer and songwriter
Agat World War II Amtrac, a submerged relic off Guam